Lance Corporal Francis Arthur Jefferson VC (18 August 1921 – 4 September 1982) was a British Army soldier and an English recipient of the Victoria Cross (VC), the highest award for gallantry in the face of the enemy that can be awarded to British and Commonwealth forces. It was awarded for his actions at the Battle of Monte Cassino in mid-1944 during the gruelling Italian campaign of the Second World War.

Details
Jefferson was 22 years old, and a fusilier in the 2nd Battalion, Lancashire Fusiliers, British Army during the Second World War when the following deed took place for which he was awarded the VC.

On 16 May 1944, during an attack on the Gustav Line, Monte Cassino, Italy, the leading company of Fusilier Jefferson's battalion had to dig in without protection. The enemy counter-attacked opening fire at short range, and Fusilier Jefferson on his own initiative seized a PIAT and, running forward under a hail of bullets, fired on the leading tank. It burst into flames and its crew were killed. The fusilier then reloaded and went towards the second tank which withdrew before he could get within range. By this time, British tanks had arrived and the enemy counter-attack was smashed.

Further reading
 Harvey, David. Monuments to Courage, 1999.
 Laffin, John. British VCs of World War 2, 1997.
 The Register of the Victoria Cross, This England, 1997.

References

External links
Frank Jefferson on the Lancashire Fusiliers Museum website
Frank Jefferson's page on the Lancashire Fusilier Website.

1921 births
1982 deaths
People from Ulverston
British Army personnel of World War II
Lancashire Fusiliers soldiers
British World War II recipients of the Victoria Cross
Railway accident deaths in England
British Army recipients of the Victoria Cross
Northamptonshire Regiment soldiers
Military personnel from Lancashire